Lampronia argillella is a moth of the family Prodoxidae. It is found in Austria, Slovakia and the Caucasus.

The wingspan is 15–17 mm.

References

Moths described in 1851
Prodoxidae
Moths of Europe